The Labrador Retriever or simply Labrador is a British breed of retriever gun dog. It was developed in the United Kingdom from fishing dogs imported from the colony of Newfoundland (now a province of Canada), and was named after the Labrador region of that colony. It is among the most commonly kept dogs in several countries, particularly in the Western world.

The Labrador is friendly, energetic, and playful. It was bred as a sporting and hunting dog but is widely kept as a companion dog. It may also be trained as a guide or assistance dog, or for rescue or therapy work.

In the 1830s, the 10th Earl of Home and his nephews, the 5th Duke of Buccleuch and Lord John Scott, imported progenitors of the breed from Newfoundland to Europe for use as gun dogs. Another early advocate of these Newfoundland fishing dogs was the 2nd Earl of Malmesbury, who bred them for their expertise in waterfowling.

During the 1880s, the 3rd Earl of Malmesbury, the 6th Duke of Buccleuch, and the 12th Earl of Home collaborated to develop and establish the Labrador Retriever breed. The dogs Buccleuch Avon and Buccleuch Ned, given by Malmesbury to Buccleuch, were mated with bitches carrying blood from those originally imported by the 5th Duke and the 10th Earl of Home. The offspring are the ancestors of all modern Labradors.

History 

The Labrador breed dates back to at least the 1830s, when St. John's water dogs bred by European settlers in Newfoundland, were first introduced to Britain from ships trading between Canada and Poole in Dorset. These were then bred with British hunting dogs to create what became known as the Labrador Retriever. Its early patrons included the Earl of Malmesbury, the Duke of Buccleuch, the Earl of Home, and Sir John Scott. Early writers have confused the Labrador with the much larger Newfoundland and the Lesser Newfoundland, with Charles St. John even referring to the Lesser Newfoundland as the Newfoundland. Colonel Peter Hawker describes the first Labrador as being not larger than an English Pointer, more often black than other colours, long in its head and nose with a deep chest, fine legs, and short and smooth coat, and did not carry its tail as highly as the Newfoundland. Hawker distinguishes the Newfoundland from both the "proper Labrador" and St. John's breed of these dogs in the fifth edition of his book Introductions to Young Sportsman, published in 1846.

A photograph taken in 1857 shows the Earl of Home's dog "Nell", described both as a Labrador and a St. John's water dog. By 1870 the name Labrador Retriever had become common in England. The liver (now usually called chocolate) Labrador emerged in the late 1800s, with liver-coloured pups documented at the Buccleuch kennels in 1892; the first yellow Labrador on record was born in 1899 (Ben of Hyde, kennels of Major C.J. Radclyffe). The breed was recognised by the Kennel Club in 1903. The first American Kennel Club (AKC) registration was in 1917.

Characteristics 

There is a great deal of variety among Labradors. The following characteristics are typical of the conformation show bred (bench-bred) lines of this breed in the United States and are based on the American Kennel Club standard. Significant differences between UK and U.S. standards are noted.
 Size: Labradors are a medium-large breed. They should be as long from the withers to the base of the tail as they are from the floor to the withers.
 Coat: The Labrador Retriever's coat should be short and dense, but not wiry. The coat is water-resistant, so the dog does not get cold when taking to the water in the winter. That means that the dog naturally has a slightly dry, oily coat. Acceptable colours are black, yellow, and chocolate.
 Head: The head should be broad with slightly pronounced eyebrows. The eyes should be kind and expressive. Appropriate eye colours are brown and hazel. The lining around the eyes should be black. The ears should hang close to the head and be set slightly above the eyes.
 Jaws: The jaws should be strong and powerful. The muzzle should be of medium length and should not be too tapered. The jaws should hang slightly and curve gracefully back.
 Body: The body should have a powerful and muscular build.

The tail and coat are designated "distinctive [or distinguishing] features" of the Labrador by both the Kennel Club and AKC. The AKC adds that the "true Labrador Retriever temperament is as much a hallmark of the breed as the 'otter' tail."

Colour 

Labradors are registered in three colours: solid black, yellow (considered from creamy white to fox-red) and chocolate (medium to dark brown and originally called "liver"). 

Puppies of all colours can occur in the same litter. Coat colour is determined primarily by three genes. The first gene (the B locus) determines the density of the coat's eumelanin pigment granules, if that pigment is allowed: dense granules result in a black coat, and sparse ones give a chocolate coat. The second (E) locus determines whether the eumelanin is produced at all. A dog with the recessive e allele will produce only phaeomelanin pigment and will be yellow regardless of its genotype at the B locus. The genes known previously have had their number increased by the introduction of the K locus, where the dominant "black" allele KB is now known to reside. 

According to a 2011 study, 13 out of 245 Labradors studied were heterozygous for the M264V mutation responsible for the melanistic mask, and one was homozygous. Within the breed, this trait is not visible.

Show and field lines 

As a result of specialised breeding, there are significant differences between field and trial-bred and show-bred lines of Labradors. In the United States, the former are sometimes mistakenly referred to as "American" and the latter as "English", in fact, both field and show types are bred in both countries and all Labrador Retrievers are descended from British lines.

Use 

Labrador Retrievers have proven to have a high success rate at becoming guide dogs. A study was recently done on how well four different breeds (Labrador Retriever, Golden Retriever, Labrador Retriever/Golden Retriever Mix, and German Shepherds) trained to become guide dogs. In this experiment, German Shepherds had the highest chance of not completing it. Labrador Retrievers and Labrador Retriever/Golden Retriever Mix had the highest success rate. However, German Shepherds and Golden Retrievers had a higher success rate after going through longer training than the training required for Labrador Retrievers.

The Labrador is a good swimmer.

They can also be used for pointing and flushing, and make excellent upland game hunting partners.

The high intelligence, initiative and self-direction of Labradors in working roles is exemplified by dogs such as Endal, who was trained to, if need be, put his human who uses a wheelchair in the recovery position, cover him with a blanket, and activate an emergency phone. A number of Labradors have also been taught to assist their owner in removing money and credit cards from ATMs with prior training.

The breed is used in water rescue/lifesaving. It continues in that role today, along with the Leonberger, Newfoundland and Golden Retriever dogs; they are used at the Italian School of Canine Lifeguard.

In war 

Labradors have been used as war dogs. During the Vietnam War they were used as scout dogs to track down dead or wounded soldiers or enemy positions.

Health 
A  Labrador may be expected to live for 10 to 12 years. 

It is a healthy breed with relatively few major problems. Notable issues related to health and well-being include inherited disorders and obesity (most are missing all or parts of the appetite-regulating POMC gene).

A Royal Veterinary College study, and one conducted by The University of Sydney, have concluded that chocolate-coloured Labradors have a shorter average life expectancy than other colours of Labrador (by about 10%) and are more likely to suffer some health problems.

Labradors are somewhat prone to hip and elbow dysplasia, especially in larger dogs. Eye diseases may include progressive retinal atrophy, cataracts, corneal dystrophy and retinal dysplasia. They can suffer from exercise induced collapse, which causes hyperthermia, weakness, collapse, and disorientation after short bouts of exercise, or from obesity, which in some cases may be partly due to the absence of part or all of the proopiomelanocortin gene.

Demography 

The Labrador is an exceptionally popular dog. As of 2006, it was widely considered the most popular breed in the world. and most popular dog by ownership in Australia, Canada, Israel, New Zealand, United Kingdom, and United States (since 1991). In both the United Kingdom and the United States, there are well over twice as many Labradors registered as the next most popular breed. If the comparison is limited to dog breeds of a similar size, then there are around 3–5 times as many Labradors registered in both countries as the next most popular breeds, the German Shepherd Dog and Golden Retriever.

They are the most popular breed of assistance dog in the United States, Australia and many other countries, as well as being widely used by police and other official bodies for their detection and working abilities. Approximately 60–70% of all guide dogs in the United States are Labradors.

Seven out of 13 of the Australian National Kennel Council "Outstanding Gundogs" Hall of Fame appointees are Labradors (list covers 2000–2005).

Famous Labradors

Notable labradors within various categories include:

Assistance dogs

 Endal, a service dog in Britain. Among other distinctions, "the most decorated dog in the world" (including "Dog of the Millennium" and the PDSA's Gold Medal for Animal Gallantry and Devotion to Duty), the first dog to ride on the London Eye and the first dog known to work a 'chip and pin' ATM card. By Endal's death in March 2009, he and his owner/handler Allen Parton had been filmed almost 350 times by crews from several countries, and a film of a year in Endal's life was in production.

Sully, served with former US President George H. W. Bush during the last six months of his life; noted for his role during the president's funeral. A form of Parkinson's disease confined the former president to a wheelchair or motorised scooter in the final years of his life. Among the services that Sully was able to perform for Bush were retrieving dropped items, opening and closing doors, pushing an emergency button and supporting him when standing.

Police, military, rescue and detection dogs

 Frida (12 April 2009 – 15 November 2022) was a yellow Labrador Retriever who worked as a search and rescue dog for the Mexican Navy (SEMAR). She was deployed to help the rescue efforts in the aftermath of natural disasters.
 Zanjeer ("Chain", or "Shackles"), a detection dog who detected arms and ammunition used in the 1993 Mumbai (Bombay) serial explosions. During his service, he helped recover 57 country-made bombs, 175 petrol bombs, 11 military-grade armaments, 242 grenades and 600 detonators. His biggest contribution to the police force and the city was the detection of 3,329 kg of RDX. He also helped detect 18 Type 56 rifles and five 9mm pistols.
 Lucky and Flo, twin Black Labrador counterfeit-detection dogs who became famous in 2007 for "sniffing out nearly 2 million counterfeit DVDs" on a six-month secondment to Malaysia in 2007. Following the multimillion-dollar, 6-arrest Malaysian detection, they became the first dogs to be awarded Malaysia's "outstanding service award" and software pirates were stated to have put a £30,000 contract out for their lives.
 Sarbi, an Australian special forces explosives detection dog that spent almost 14 months missing in action (MIA) in Afghanistan before being recovered safe and well in 2009.
 Jake, an American black Labrador who served as a search and rescue dog following the September 11 attacks and Hurricane Katrina.
 Salty and Roselle, awarded the Dickin Medal for conspicuous gallantry or devotion to duty while serving in military conflict. They led their blind owners down more than 70 flights of stairs to escape from the damaged World Trade Center in September 2001
 Sadie, awarded the Dickin Medal for conspicuous gallantry or devotion to duty while serving in military conflict. She detected explosive devices, which were subsequently disarmed, while serving in Kabul, Afghanistan, in November 2005; she served with the Royal Gloucestershire, Berkshire and Wiltshire Regiment
 Sasha, awarded the Dickin Medal for conspicuous gallantry or devotion to duty while serving in military conflict. Located 15 improvised explosive devices, mortars, mines, and weapons while serving in Afghanistan, with the Royal Army Veterinary Corps. In July 2008 Sasha and her handler were killed in a Taliban ambush by a rocket-propelled grenade.

Pets
 Former President of the United States Bill Clinton's Labradors Buddy and Seamus.
 Russian President Vladimir Putin's Labrador 'Konni'.
 Marley, "The World's Worst Dog", featured in journalist John Grogan's autobiographical book Marley & Me, adapted into a 2008 comedy drama film of the same name.
 Global superstar Celine Dion's labradors Charlie and Bear. They were represented in numerous magazines with the singer and her family, becoming pets celebrities in their own names. <ref> </ref </ref>

References

 Dog breeds originating in the United Kingdom
 FCI breeds
 Lifesaving
 Provincial symbols of Newfoundland and Labrador
 Retrievers
Gundogs